Tikkun/Tikun/Tiqqun is a Hebrew word meaning "amending/fixing". It has several connotations in Judaism:

Traditional
Tikkun (book), a book of Torah scroll text
Tohu and Tikkun, the two stages of Existence described in the Kabbalah of Isaac Luria
Tikkun refers to the nightly/early morning synagogue readings on certain Jewish holidays, for example, Hoshana Rabbah
Tikkun HaKlali, ten psalms that correspond to ten types of melody
Tikkun olam, the popular Jewish concept of "mending the world"

Contemporary
Tikkun (magazine), a quarterly interfaith Jewish magazine and website
Tiqqun, a radical French philosophical journal
Tikkun (film), a 2015 Israeli film

Hebrew words and phrases